The 2014 Heineken Open was a tennis tournament played on outdoor hard courts. It was the 39th edition of the Heineken Open, and was part of the ATP World Tour 250 series of the 2014 ATP World Tour. It took place at the ASB Tennis Centre in Auckland, New Zealand, from 6 January to 11 January 2014. John Isner won the singles title.

Points and prize money

Point distribution

Prize money 

* per team

Singles main-draw entrants

Seeds

1 Rankings as of December 30, 2013

Other entrants
The following players received wildcards into the singles main draw:
  Marcos Baghdatis
  Jack Sock
  Rubin Statham

The following players received entry from the qualifying draw:
  Daniel Gimeno Traver
  Lukáš Lacko
  Donald Young
  Bradley Klahn

The following players received entry as lucky loser:
  Steve Johnson

Withdrawals
Before the tournament
  Brian Baker → replaced by  Michał Przysiężny
  Gaël Monfils (fatigue) → replaced by  Steve Johnson
  Tommy Robredo (right arm injury) → replaced by  Santiago Giraldo

ATP doubles main-draw entrants

Seeds

1 Rankings as of December 30, 2013

Other entrants
The following pairs received wildcards into the doubles main draw:
  Colin Fleming /  Ross Hutchins
  Jose Rubin Statham /  Michael Venus
The following pair received entry as alternates:
  Roberto Bautista Agut /  Daniel Gimeno Traver

Withdrawals
Before the tournament
  Michał Przysiężny (illness)
During the tournament
  Jamie Murray (back injury)

Champions

Singles 

  John Isner defeated  Lu Yen-hsun, 7–6(7–4), 7–6(9–7)

Doubles 

  Julian Knowle /  Marcelo Melo defeated  Alexander Peya /  Bruno Soares, 4–6, 6–3, [10–5]

See also
 2014 ASB Classic – women's tournament

References

External links